Patissa ochreipalpalis is a moth in the family Crambidae. It was described by George Hampson in 1919. It is found on Mayotte off the coast of Southeast Africa.

The forewings and hindwings are uniform silvery white.

References

Moths described in 1919
Schoenobiinae